Das 2. Gebot (German for "The 2nd Commandment") is the third studio album released by the Neue Deutsche Härte band Unheilig. It was released on April 7, 2003, in two versions, a standard 12-track edition and a limited double-disc edition. The limited, double-disc edition includes the "Maschine" maxi-CD as a bonus disc. The song "Maschine" was used in Project Gotham Racing 2 for the Xbox.

In July 2009, Das 2. Gebot was re-released with new artwork and a remastered audio track.

Track listing 
Album disc:
Eva - 4:40
Maschine - 4:05
Gib mir mehr - 3:38
Sternenschiff - 4:38
Vollmond - 6:43
Jetzt noch nicht - 4:19
Der Mann im Mond - 3:56
Schutzengel - 4:24
Rache - 4:38
Mona Lisa - 4:15
Krieg der Engel - 4:05
Herzland - 3:43

Tracks 2, 3, 10 and 12 were produced by José Alvarez-Brill, while the remaining tracks were produced by Der Graf.

Bonus "Maschine" disc:
Maschine [Club Edit] - 4:14
Maschine [Album Version] - 4:05
This Corrosion (The Sisters Of Mercy-cover) - 8:39
Maschine [Der Graf Remix] - 5:16
Schleichfahrt - 4:07

References

Unheilig albums
German-language albums